Harry Ryle Hopps (1869 – August 24, 1937, Los Angeles) was an American businessman and artist. He was the son of George Hopps and Ann Hopps,  both artists. George Hopps was a stage set designer. Hopps subsequently moved to Los Angeles, where he worked as an art director on a number of films such as The Thief of Bagdad.
 
The United Glass Company were responsible for the stained glass at the Cypress Lawn Memorial Park in Colma, California. Hopps designed the recruiting poster Destroy this Mad Brute: Enlist, published in 1917, which shows a gorilla with a pickelhaube helmet labeled "militarism" holding a bloody club labeled "Kultur" and a topless woman as he stomps onto the shore of America, illustrating anti-German sentiment in the U.S. during World War I.

References

American poster artists
1869 births
1937 deaths
American art directors
People from Los Angeles